Eternity in Death (2007) is a novella written by J. D. Robb.  It is one of the few In Death stories to incorporate elements of the supernatural.  It takes place before Creation in Death.

Plot summary
Tiara Kent lights several candles in her room, and turns off her security system.  She drinks a special "potion", and prepares for her mystery man to arrive.  The next morning, Lt. Eve Dallas, and Delia Peabody are called to Tiara's apartment.  The man she invited bit her in the neck, and drank her blood as she bled out, and Peabody recognises the murder as one perpetrated by a vampire.

Eve and Peabody talk to Tiara's friend, Daffy Wheates, who informs them Tiara was going to an underground vampire club, called Bloodbath, and had in fact met a man. Eve heads to see Iris Francine, and then Dr. Charlotte Mira, but is accompanied by her billionaire husband Roarke, who is curious himself about the vampire murder.

Iris is unable to tell Eve much of anything, and Dr. Mira is only able to say that the killer believes he is a vampire, that he tried to turn Tiara into one, and he will continue trying until he gets it right.  The tox report reveals that the "potion" Tiara drunk, was a mixture of hallucinogens, tranqs, date rape drugs, and human blood.  Detective Ian McNab is called in to help with the investigation, not because of what he can contribute, but because he thinks vampires are cool.  They head off to the club, and Eve discovers Peabody is now wearing a cross, to ward of vampires.  Eve gets irritated, and makes Peabody repeat "Vampires don't exist" over and over again.

Dallas, Roarke, Peabody, and McNab arrive at Bloodbath, which is literally, an underground club.  They are greeted by the bartender, Allesseria Carter, who is serving pig's blood to people who think they are vampires, and Dorian Vadim, who owns the club.  Dallas automatically suspects Dorian, who admits to being a vampire, but not to killing Tiara, and he agrees to give blood, to be tested against the blood found in Tiara Kent's stomach.  He uses a syringe, brought by Allesseria, who also gives him an alibi for the time of the murder.  Dallas checks Dorian's records, finding out he came from Europe, where he worked as a magician.

As Allesseria Carter leaves Bloodbath for the last time, she considers calling the police, and admitting she lied for Dorian.  Before she can, Dorian attacks and kills her, leaving twin puncture wounds on the neck.  The next morning, Dallas and Roarke find a link message from Allesseria, that was interrupted when she was attacked.  Eve and Roarke head out to the crime scene.  Allesseria's blood has been partially drained, bottled, and drunk.  Peabody gives Dallas the worst news she could get: Dorian's blood doesn't match the blood Tiara drank.

Dallas does get some interesting news.  The DNA Dorian gave to them does turn up at another homicide, as the DNA of a deadbody.  A man in Bulgaria, named Pensky Gregor, who was a part of a prison work program, was killed by twin puncture wounds.  They remember Dorian was originally a magician, and he swapped the vials of blood in his own night club, while three detectives and Roarke watched.  Dallas head off to see Morse the coroner, who found saliva and semen on the body.  On the way, she finds that Detective David Baxter has hung garlic up, and is carrying a wooden stake.

The detectives and Roarke head to Bloodbath.  Dallas tries to get Dorian to go to Cop Central, but Dorian is able to refuse because of his religious beliefs.  No matter how hard Dallas tries, APA Cher Reo confirms her worst fears:  they  can't touch Dorian as long as the sun is up.  Roarke puts a silver cross around her neck, to ward off vampires.  Dallas organizes a conference, to prepare to take down Dorian after the sun goes down.  Dallas herself will go to see Dorian, and the cops will move in, should he attack her.  Before she goes, Baxter gives her his wooden stake.

Dallas goes into Bloodbath alone, and is invited upstairs by Dorian.  Dallas then tells him that she has his voice print, which she got off of Allesseria Carter's phone call.  Enraged, Dorian attacks her, causing Roarke and the others to rush in.  By the time they reach Dallas, they find Dorian is laying on the floor bleeding from a stomach wound:  Dallas has stabbed him with the wooden stake.

In Death (novel series)
2007 American novels
American novellas
Vampire novels